The China Media Centre was launched in 2005 by Jeremy Paxman and Sun Yusheng, vice-president of state-owned China Central Television (CCTV). It was set up within the University of Westminster’s Culture and Media Research Institute (CAMRI).

The China Media Centre (CMC) stated purpose is to study the world's largest media system. Funded initially by a grant from the Quintin Hogg Foundation, the China Media Centre has provided for itself since 2007 by winning consultancy contracts from the British, Danish, Chinese and Swedish governments plus sponsorship from British companies for specific activities. Its first client was the Foreign and Commonwealth Office (FCO). The Danish and Swedish governments have employed CMC to deliver workshops in China.

China Media Centre activities have also funded scholarships, fee-waivers, conferences, seminars and research visits, as well as day-to-day administration so that today it is able to connect the Chinese and European media.

When originally set up, CMC's courses were focused largely on media, but the course portfolio has evolved and has diversified such that there are less in media and more in creative industries and innovation. CMC's main portfolio today is in entertainment TV. CMC runs three to four Summer Schools per year, where groups of 30+ third or fourth year undergraduates from partner universities spend three weeks in the UK learning a mixture of theory and practice skills.

China Media Centre is led by Hugo de Burgh, Professor of Journalism in the Communications and Media Research Institute of the University of Westminster. He is State Administration of Foreign Experts Affairs Endowment Professor at Tsinghua University, honorary fellow at the 48 Group Club, and board member at the Great Britain–China Centre.

References

External links
 

China Central Television
University of Westminster